Natural Snow Buildings is a duo from France, consisting of artists Mehdi Ameziane and Solange Gularte. They play music which can be classified as experimental psychedelic folk with drone elements and ambient influences. Formed in 1998, they have released numerous albums, many of them in extremely limited quantities.

Both members of Natural Snow Buildings release music also as solo artists: Mehdi Ameziane as TwinSisterMoon and Solange Gularte as Isengrind.

History
The beginnings of Natural Snow Buildings can be traced back to 1997, at a Paris university. They met in their school library where a film was playing. Mehdi had been invited to a party that evening but declined and headed to the library instead. After their first meeting, the two saw more of each other. Although Mehdi could play a bit of guitar and Solange was a classically trained musician, the two had not yet begun making music.

It was in May 1998 that the two officially started their band and began home recording their music.  They self-released two cassettes, Witch-Season and Two Sides of a Horse in 1999 and 2000, and in 2001 recorded Ghost Folks, released in 2003.  Then, they self-released a double CD, The Winter Ray, in a limited edition, and, after moving from Paris to Vitré, Brittany in 2004, recorded The Dance of the Moon and the Sun (released in 2006). They then each issued solo material before producing more material as a duo.

Most of their albums have only been released in small numbers, often in hand-crafted limited editions. However, since 2012 they have released several records on prominent independent labels such as Ba Da Bing Records, which has also reissued some of their earlier recordings, including Night Coercion Into the Company of Witches and the Isengrind/Twinsistermoon/Natural Snow Buildings split The Snowbringer Cult. Their work has been compared with such bands as Popol Vuh, Flying Saucer Attack, and Tower Recordings. They make many references to the horror film genre in their song titles; for example Santa Sangre (with the track "Santa Sangre Part I & II" on Daughter of Darkness), The Blair Witch Project (The track "Mary Brown" on Dance of the Moon and the Sun is a reference to a character from this film) and director John Carpenter (a track on Dance of the Moon and the Sun).

Discography - Natural Snow Buildings

Albums

2003 - Ghost Folks
2004 - The Winter Ray
2006 - The Dance of the Moon and the Sun
2008 - Between The Real And The Shadow
2008 - Norns
2008 - Sung To The North
2008 - The Snowbringer Cult (CD2)
2008 - Laurie Bird
2008 - Slayer of the King of Hell
2008 - The Wheel of Sharp Daggers
2008 - Night Coercion Into the Company of Witches
2008 - Sunlit Stone (released with a special edition of re-issued The Dance of the Moon and the Sun)
2009 - Daughter of Darkness
2009 - Daughter of Darkness V
2009 - Shadow Kingdom
2010 - The Centauri Agent
2011 - Waves of the Random Sea
2011 - Chants of Niflheim
2012 - Beyond the Veil
2013 - The Snowbringer Cult
2014 - The Night Country
2014 - Live At Cragg Vale
2015 - Terror's Horns
2015 - The Ladder (released as a bonus CD with a special pre-order edition of Terror's Horns)
2016 - Aldebaran

EPs
2008 - The Moonraiser
2008 - The Sundowner

Compilations
2008 - I Dream of Drone (5CDr box set, only one copy produced & given free to a friend of the band: Jed B)
2008 - Tracks on the Bloody Snow (CDr, 2 known versions: one with brown sleeve, one with red. Compilation of early recordings 1998/1999)

Demos
1999 - Witch-Season
2000 - Two Sides of a Horse

Discography - solo

TwinSisterMoon

Albums
2007 - When Stars Glide Through Solid
2007 - Levels and Crossings
2008 - The Snowbringer Cult (Tracks 9–16 on CD1)
2009 - The Hollow Mountain
2010 - Then Fell The Ashes
2012 - Bogyrealm Vessels

EPs
2008 - Rivers of Blood Ending in the Sun
2009 - Bride of the Spirits

Isengrind

Albums
2007 - Golestân
2008 - The Snowbringer Cult (Tracks 1–8 on CD1)
2009 - Journey of the Seven Stars
2010 - Modlitewnik
2012 - Night of Raining Fire
2014 - Underflesh

References

French experimental music groups
Musical groups established in 1998
Drone music groups
Male–female musical duos